Adam Gaudette (born October 3, 1996) is an American professional ice hockey center for the Springfield Thunderbirds of the American Hockey League (AHL) while under contract to the St. Louis Blues of the National Hockey League (NHL). He previously played for the Vancouver Canucks, Chicago Blackhawks, and Ottawa Senators. Gaudette played college ice hockey for the Northeastern Huskies of the NCAA, where he won the Hobey Baker Award, Hockey East Player of the Year, and was named to the AHCA East First-Team All-American. Selected by the Vancouver Canucks in the 2015 NHL Entry Draft, he made his NHL debut with the team in 2018.

Early life 
Gaudette was born on October 3, 1996, in Braintree, Massachusetts, to Tara, an elementary school instructional coach, and Doug Gaudette, a firefighter. He came from an athletic family: his mother played softball for Taunton High School, once holding the single-season home run record, while his father's high school athletic career ended after a dirt bike accident shattered his patella. Gaudette played a number of sports, including lacrosse and baseball, but his favorite was ice hockey. In sixth grade, Gaudette was admitted to Thayer Academy to join their hockey team, and his family moved from Taunton, Massachusetts, to Braintree to accommodate his commute to and from the skating rink. There, he was coached by former National Hockey League (NHL) player Tony Amonte. Although he lost most of his first two high school ice hockey seasons to injuries, as a junior, Gaudette recorded 67 points in 27 games. Around this same time, he played minor ice hockey for the Boston Advantage of the Tier 1 Elite Hockey League.

Playing career

Junior
In the 2013–14 season, Gaudette scored 29 goals in 27 games at Thayer Academy. In 2014, he committed to playing for Northeastern University.

Skating as a freshman for the Cedar Rapids RoughRiders of the United States Hockey League, Gaudette scored 30 points in 41 games.

The Vancouver Canucks drafted Gaudette 149th overall in the fifth round of the 2015 NHL Entry Draft after acquiring the pick from the New York Rangers in exchange for Raphael Diaz. Despite being drafted, Gaudette agreed to play for Northeastern University, as he committed to do in 2014.

College
In 2016, he tallied a goal and an assist to beat fellow Canucks prospect Thatcher Demko of Boston College to propel Northeastern to the Hockey East Championship.

Two years after being drafted in the fifth round, he was called a "first-rate prospect," ranking first in NCAA power-play goals with 14 and third in points after 31 games and in the top 10 nationally. Pierre McGuire described him as "the steal of the 2015 draft."

During the 2017–18 season Gaudette recorded career highs in goals and assists while leading the Huskies to their first Beanpot championship in 30 years. During the 66th Beanpot Final, Gaudette recorded a hat trick to help Northeastern beat Boston University 5–2. He earned the Most Outstanding Player for his efforts. Gaudette signed an entry level contract with the Canucks on March 26, 2018, after he finished the 2017–18 season first in the NCAA with 60 points. At the end of the season, Gaudette won Hockey East Player of the Year and was awarded the Hockey East Scoring Champion title. He was also named to the First All-Star Team. On April 6, 2018, Gaudette was announced as the Hobey Baker Award winner. He was also named an AHCA East First-Team All-American along with teammates Dylan Sikura and Jeremy Davies.

Professional

Gaudette made his NHL debut on March 29, 2018, in a game against the Edmonton Oilers. As the Canucks failed to make the post season, he only appeared in 5 games.

After attending Canucks training camp prior to the 2018–19 season, Gaudette was reassigned to their American Hockey League (AHL) affiliate, the Utica Comets. However, his stint in the AHL did not last long as he was called up to the NHL on October 15 after playing in four games for the Comets, where he tallied two goals and two assists. On October 25, he earned his first career NHL point, assisting on a Darren Archibald goal, the only Canucks goal scored in a 4–1 loss at the Arizona Coyotes. He scored his first NHL goal on November 24, scoring the first Canucks goal in a 4–2 victory at the Los Angeles Kings. Despite being expected to spend most of the season developing in Utica, injuries to Canucks centers resulted in Gaudette appearing in 56 games for Vancouver. Gaudette ended his rookie season with five goals and seven assists, generally playing center on Vancouver's third line.

Gaudette made Vancouver's 2019–20 season roster out of training camp; however, he was reassigned to Utica on October 24, 2019, after playing in only three of Vancouver's first nine games. After being recalled on October 27, Gaudette responded by scoring six goals and ten points in November 2019, solidifying his spot in the lineup. Gaudette ended the COVID-19-shortened 2019–20 season with 12 goals, 21 assists, and 33 points in 59 games. Gaudette played in 10 of Vancouver 17 playoff games, going pointless.

On October 19, 2020, the Canucks re-signed Gaudette to a one-year, $950,000 contract. In the  season he appeared in 33 games for the Canucks, scoring four goals and seven points.

On April 12, 2021, Gaudette was traded to the Chicago Blackhawks in exchange for Matthew Highmore. He played in seven games for the Blackhawks, scoring one goal and four points. On July 26, the Blackhawks signed Gaudette to a one-year, $997,500 contract extension.

On November 26, 2021, the Blackhawks placed Gaudette on waivers. He played in eight games with the Blackhawks, scoring one goal and two points. He was claimed by the Ottawa Senators the following day. He played in 50 games for the Senators, scoring 12 points.

As a free agent, after not being tendered a qualifying offer from the Senators, Gaudette was signed a one-year, $750,000 contract with the Toronto Maple Leafs on July 13, 2022. Gaudette cleared waivers and was assigned to the Maple Leafs AHL affiliate, the Toronto Marlies on October 13, 2022. On December 9, 2022, Gaudette was suspended for three games for an incident during a game with the Belleville Senators. He played in 40 games with the Marlies, scoring 20 goals and 34 points.

On February 17, 2023, the Maple Leafs traded Gaudette to the St. Louis Blues, along with prospect Mikhail Abramov and several draft picks as part of a three-team trade also involving the Minnesota Wild. The Maple Leafs acquired Ryan O'Reilly and Noel Acciari in the trade.

Playing style
Gaudette says he tries to model his game after players like Jonathan Toews and Patrice Bergeron. He has been described as a center "known for his defensive prowess and his 200-foot game."

Personal life
Gaudette and his wife married in June 2020. Gaudette has two brothers; youngest brother Cam plays in the Hockey East for the Northeastern University, while Brady is committed to play in the Hockey East for the University of Maine. During the NHL off-season, Gaudette runs an active Twitch channel, where he streams himself playing video games mainly Call of Duty, and interacts with fans; he has stated that he enjoys doing this as an opportunity to "give fans some inside intel on what our [NHL players'] lives are like outside of hockey."

Career statistics

Regular season and playoffs

International

Awards and honors

References

External links
 

1996 births
Living people
AHCA Division I men's ice hockey All-Americans
American expatriate ice hockey players in Canada
American men's ice hockey centers
Cedar Rapids RoughRiders players
Chicago Blackhawks players
Hobey Baker Award winners
Ice hockey players from Massachusetts
Northeastern Huskies men's ice hockey players
Ottawa Senators players
Sportspeople from Braintree, Massachusetts
Springfield Thunderbirds players
Toronto Marlies players
Utica Comets players
Vancouver Canucks draft picks
Vancouver Canucks players